The 2002 Robert Morris Colonials football team represented Robert Morris University as a member of the Northeast Conference (NEC) during the 2002 NCAA Division I-AA football season. The Colonials were led by 9th-year head coach Joe Walton and played their home games at Moon Stadium on the campus of Moon Area High School.

Schedule

References

Robert Morris
Robert Morris Colonials football seasons
Robert Morris Colonials football